is a town located in Asakura District, Fukuoka Prefecture, Japan.

As of March 31, 2017, the town has an estimated population of 29,617 and a density of 437 persons per km². The total area is 67.18 km².

The town was founded on March 22, 2005 by the merger of the towns of Miwa and Yasu, both from Asakura District.

References

External links

Chikuzen official website 

Towns in Fukuoka Prefecture